Mulfingen is a town in the district of Hohenlohe in Baden-Württemberg in Germany.

Friedrich Wohnsiedler (1879–1958), a native of the town, emigrated to New Zealand around 1900 and became a notable wine-maker.

References

Hohenlohe (district)